Eurybatus may refer to:

In Greek history and mythology:
See Eurybatus (mythology), for mythological characters named Eurybatus
Eurybatus, one of the Argonauts
 Eurybatus, one of the Cercopes
 Eurybatus, one of the commanders in the Battle of Sybota
 Eurybatus or Eurybarus, a mythological warrior
 One of a pair of chthonic tricksters who disturbed Heracles while he served Omphale
 Eurybatus of Ephesus, who betrayed Croesus to Cyrus
 Eurybatus, a leader during the Peloponnesian War

See also
Eurybates, the Achaean herald of the Iliad